McGinness is a surname. Notable people with the surname include:

 Joe McGinness (1914-2003), Australian Aboriginal activist, son of Lucy McGinness
 John McGinness (born 1943), American physicist
 Jack McGinness,  Australia's first elected Aboriginal union leader, son of Lucy McGinness and father of Kathy Mills
 Lucy McGinness (1874?–1961), aka Alngindabu, Aboriginal Australian elder
 Mike McGinness (born 1947), American politician
 Paul McGinness (1896–1955), American World War I flying ace
 Ryan McGinness (born 1972), American artist
 Val McGinness, daughter of Lucy McGinness

See also
McGinness Airport, a defunct airport in Lancaster County, Pennsylvania, United States